Antuo Hill station is a station of Shenzhen Metro Line 2 and Line 7. Line 2 platforms opened on 28 June 2011 and Line 7 platforms opened on 28 October 2016.

Station layout

Exits

References

External links
 Shenzhen Metro Antuo Hill Station (Line 2) (Chinese)
 Shenzhen Metro Antuo Hill Station (Line 2) (English)
 Shenzhen Metro Antuo Hill Station (Line 7) (Chinese)
 Shenzhen Metro Antuo Hill Station (Line 7) (English)

Shenzhen Metro stations
Railway stations in Guangdong
Futian District
Railway stations in China opened in 2011